National Audit Office may refer to audit authorities of various national governments:

 Australian National Audit Office, an agency of the federal Commonwealth government, established 1901
  ('Federal Court of Auditors'), the Germany body, re-established in West Germany in 1948
 Court of Audit (France), the Court of Audit in France, established in 1807
 National Audit Office (China), the supreme audit institution of the People's Republic, established in 1983
 National Audit Office of Estonia, established by the provisional government in 1918; reestablished in 1990
 National Audit Office of Lithuania, the supreme audit institution in Lithuania, established 1919
 National Audit Office (United Kingdom), parliamentary body, established in its current form in 1983
 Swedish National Audit Office, established in its current form in 2003